Birinci Əlicanlı (also, Alidzhanly Pervyye, Alydzhanly Pervoye, Alydzhanly Pervyy, and Birinci Alıncanlı) is a village and municipality in the Zardab Rayon of Azerbaijan.  It has a population of 1,143.

References 

Populated places in Zardab District